Hugh Thomas Wedlock Jr. (February 15, 1908 - December 13, 1993) was an American screenwriter. He worked with Howard Snyder writing for Jack Benny's radio and television program The Jack Benny Program; he also wrote for The Red Skelton Show. Wedlock died in December 1993 of heart failure in Los Angeles, California, at the age of 85.

References

External links 

1908 births
1993 deaths
People from Brooklyn
Screenwriters from New York (state)
American male television writers
American radio writers
American television writers
American male screenwriters
20th-century American screenwriters
American comedy writers